MV Skagit was a Skagit Kalama-class passenger ferry originally operated by Washington State Ferries (WSF) from 1989–2009 and then in Tanzania until her sinking in Zanzibar in July 2012.

Operational history
Together they served on the Seattle-Vashon Island route (see King County Water Taxi). In 2006, WSF was directed to end its passenger-only service, and in 2011 Skagit and Kalama were sold and transported to Tanzania to provide service between the mainland and Zanzibar.

Sinking
On July 18, 2012, the vessel sank near Chumbe Island while in ferry service in Tanzania. At least 146 were rescued while as many as 150 were still missing after a day of rescue operations. Early reports attributed the disaster to high winds and overloading of passengers. The ship was certified for a maximum capacity of 250 yet officials said it had 290 aboard at the time.

Outcome 
The Zanzibar government blamed the disaster on the ship operating over too long of a distance, and the island's transportation minister resigned. In addition, vessels had been warned not to make the crossing because of the high seas, according to Tanzania's chief meteorologist. After Skagits loss, Zanzibar barred sister ship MV Kalama from operating and later "deleted" her and three other ferries from its list of sea vessels for safety reasons.

See also
 Zanzibar ferry sinking, a different disaster in 2011
 List of maritime disasters

References

External links
 — Capital Television News Tanzania, October 11, 2012

Washington State Ferries vessels
1989 ships
Maritime incidents in 2012
2012 in Tanzania
Maritime incidents in Tanzania
Ships built in New Orleans
July 2012 events in Africa
2012 disasters in Africa